t Rijpje or Rijpje or  is a hamlet in the Dutch province of North Holland. It is a part of the municipality of Schagen.

't Rijpje is considered part of Eenigenburg. It has place name signs.

References

Schagen
Populated places in North Holland